Palo Cedro (Spanish for "Cedar Wood") is a census-designated place (CDP) in Shasta County, California, United States. It is 8 miles (13 km) east of Redding, California.  Its population is 2,931 as of the 2020 census, up from 1,269 from the 2010 census.

Originally, indigenous Native Americans lived in Northern California, including what is now Shasta County, prior to European American settlement. European American exploration of inland California started in 1769 and continued on into the 19th century. Cow Creek, a Sacramento River tributary that runs south through Palo Cedro, was a conduit for entrance into the Sacramento Valley by Hudson Bay Fur Company trappers including Alexander McLeod (1829) and John Work (1832). The town is named after cedarwood trees originally indigenous to the area in the 19th Century.

As of the 2020 census, Palo Cedro has a population density of 780 people per square mile (300/km2). Award-winning country musician Merle Haggard lived in Palo Cedro for decades until his death on April 6, 2016.

History

Indigenous peoples

Prior to white settlement, various Indian tribes settled and inhabited Northern California. These tribes included the Wintu, Patwins, Nozi, Pit Rivers, Hat Creeks, Shastas, Paiutes, and Modoc Indian tribes. The Wintus established their main camp on Cottonwood Creek. Penutian Indian tribes on the Pacific coast or valley included the Maidu, Miwok, Constanoan, Yokuts, Yanas, and other divisions.  Historians said that, in the lower 48 continental United States, California has the most native tribes and subdivisions of tribes and more different Indian languages. The Wintus were the largest and most peaceful division that settled in Northern California and Oregon.

18th and 19th centuries

During the 18th Century, the first recorded Spanish (or any European) land entry and exploration of the present-day state of California, was the Portolá expedition, in 1769–1770, that led to the founding of Alta California, reaching as far north as San Francisco Bay.

The 19th Century launched many explorations by whites into California and its northern interior. In March 1812, the Russian-American Fur Company under Ivan Kuskov established a colony at Fort Ross on the coast of what is now Sonoma County. As early as 1817, Father Narciso Durán, on an expedition sighted a snow capped mountain (Mount Shasta), that he called Jesus Maria, from what is now the Marysville plains.  Three years later, in 1827, an expedition to the Klammath Mountains from the Coastal Range, by explorer Luis Argüello and company, sighted two "twin" mountains, believed to be Mount Shasta and Mount Lassen. In 1826, Mount Shasta was seen by Hudson Bay fur trader Peter Skene Odgen. In 1828, Mt. Shasta was seen by United States fur trapper Jedediah Smith, whom he named Mt. Simpson. On April 11, 1828 Smith and his party traveled north and entered what is now called Shasta County, and proceeded to what is now called Burnt Ranch in Trinity County.

The earliest European American history of Palo Cedro comes from the exploration of Hudson's Bay Company trapper Alexander McLeod (c. 1782 – 11 June 1840) who sometime between March 26, 1829 and April 6, 1829, along with guide John Turner, and a brigade of trappers, traveling through Mexican California, started from the Pit River following the Cow Creek trail, and reached the Sacramento River. Cow Creek is a Sacramento River tributary that runs through Palo Cedro and serves as its Southeastern border. McLeod had been sent out earlier in January 1829 from Fort Vancouver to find the origins of a mythical Buenaventura River. After crossing the Sacramento River, McLeod explored and trapped in the Sacramento Valley as far South as present day Stockton.  Upon his return with an abundant supply of furs, he camped on the west bank of the Sacramento River by present day Anderson in December 1829.  While attempting to cross the Cascades in winter, McLeod was met by a snow storm at the headwaters of the river named after him, McLeod River (McCloud River), he lost all his horses, was forced to cache his furs, and by snowshoe trek back to Vancouver, arriving on February 10, 1830. 

In 1832, another Hudson's Bay trapper John Work (c.1792-1861), searching for a route to connect the Columbia River to the Sacramento River, reported in his journal traveling through Mexican California in with a group from the Hudson's Bay Company fur traders, staying east of the Siskiyous, bypassing Mt. Lassen, along Cow Creek, through the areas now known as Millville and Palo Cedro, finding a way to the Sacramento Valley. In the surrounding area, Work noted there were local Indians who lived in huts, in addition to various wildlife and numerous animals, including deer, elk, and grizzly bears. Local Indian men gave Work and his men food.  Work called Cow Creek, Canoe River, and his men chopped down pine trees to make canoes, camped near what is now called Anderson.  During their stay, while his men were making the canoes, Work said the Indians were weeping and lamenting and observed six fires were burning in the Indian camp.  Work later learned that the local Indian camp had been attacked and burned by another Indian raiding party, possibly the Shastas. After trapping in the Sacramento Valley, work retraced his steps to the Pit River, and using the same route as McLeod had earlier used through Bartle's Gap, but without disaster, emerged from the mountains and was assisted back to Vancouver.

In 1846, on his third expedition, John C. Frémont and his military party, followed the Cow Creek, Walla Walla Trail through what is now Shasta County, headed north to Klammath Lake area in Oregon. Frémont's guide for three federal expeditions was mountain man Kit Carson.

In June 1850, U.S. Army Captain Nathaniel Lyon, and his military party along with Colonel Freaner, left Pierson Reading's Rancho Buena Ventura following Fremont's route through the Cow Creek and Pit River. Lyon had been sent from Benicia by his government to avenge the death of Captain Warren. 

In 1883, a United States post office was established for this area; at that time, the town was known as Albertson. The name was changed to Roberts in 1885 and finally to Palo Cedro in 1893, meaning "cedarwood" in Spanish, after the cedar trees of the area.

In 1891, T. W. H. Shannahan and Joe Enright bought  of land from Lem Benton and had it divided into 12 lots. The town never materialized or was developed, but the original cedar tree for which it was named was cut down. School children since then planted cedar trees at the Junction School District yard.

In 1897, or shortly before, the Anderson and Bella Vista Railroad was constructed by the Terry Lumber Company from Anderson to Bella Vista, passing through Palo Cedro.  Miners used this railroad, as did the Terry Lumber Company at Bella Vista.  The train delivered groceries and mail to the villages along its route. It also had a passenger car.

20th and 21st centuries

In the early 1900s, the stage route went from Redding through Palo Cedro, Millville, Oak Run, and on to Fall River Mills.

Palo Cedro's first school house was located near the corner of Hillside Drive and Deschutes Road on the south side of town. Later it was moved to a site near the Grange Hall, on the north side of town. The school was located there until the "new" Junction School was built in 1960 on the south side of town.

In 1907 or thereabouts, Frank and Mary Love owned the Palo Cedro general store. The store was on the west side of the tracks and their house on the east.  A two-story house on the northeast corner of Deschutes Road and Old Forty-Four Drive may, at one time, have been a stopping place for stage drivers and travelers. Sarah Addington later owned the Palo Cedro store.  She was also the postmaster and handed the position down to her daughter, Mary Jones. She moved the post office next door into her home.

John Gebauer has since owned the store. In the 1960s John moved to his new building on the south east side of Palo Cedro; it had several one-story spaces for commercial businesses. The largest business was the Palo Cedro Market. Gebauer's son John now operates it. The post office moved into a part of Gebauer's building. Mary Jones' assistants were her sisters. The next postmaster was Sylvia Metz. As she found the post office needed more space, it moved to a two-story building on the north side of Palo Cedro.

The first Grange Hall and Feed Store were constructed in the early 1930s, just off Deschutes Road on Old Highway 44.  The building was two stories with the meeting and/or dance hall upstairs. The dining room was downstairs in back and the feed store in front. This building burned down in the early 1940s and was quickly replaced with a one-story building, which is still in use in the 21st century. The feed store was built on the north side of Old Forty-Four Drive and is still there today.

As Palo Cedro continued to grow more services were needed, and the first independently owned pharmacy opened in August 1975.  Its first space was a remodelled auto body shop. To accommodate its growing business, it moved to the current location on the south side of Highway 44 off Deschutes Road. Palo Cedro Pharmacy has an eclectic mix of pictures, memorabilia, and antiques collected over the last 40 years showing how the town and pharmacy has changed over the years.

Geography
Palo Cedro is located at  (40.551091, −122.234255) at an elevation of 465 ft (143 m) above sea level.

Demographics

2010
The 2010 United States Census reported that Palo Cedro had a population of 1,269. The racial makeup of Palo Cedro was 1,164 (91.7%) White, 7 (0.6%) African American, 24 (1.9%) Native American, 6 (0.5%) Asian, 1 (0.1%) Pacific Islander, 22 (1.7%) from other races, and 45 (3.5%) from two or more races. Hispanic or Latino of any race were 74 persons (5.8%).

The Census reported that 1,260 people (99.3% of the population) lived in households, 4 (0.3%) lived in non-institutionalized group quarters, and 5 (0.4%) were institutionalized.

There were 474 households, out of which 153 (32.3%) had children under the age of 18 living in them, 318 (67.1%) were opposite-sex married couples living together, 41 (8.6%) had a female householder with no husband present, 24 (5.1%) had a male householder with no wife present.  There were 18 (3.8%) unmarried opposite-sex partnerships, and 7 (1.5%) same-sex married couples or partnerships. 70 households (14.8%) were made up of individuals, and 38 (8.0%) had someone living alone who was 65 years of age or older. The average household size was 2.66.  There were 383 families (80.8% of all households); the average family size was 2.89.

The population was spread out, with 289 people (22.8%) under the age of 18, 74 people (5.8%) aged 18 to 24, 192 people (15.1%) aged 25 to 44, 429 people (33.8%) aged 45 to 64, and 285 people (22.5%) who were 65 years of age or older.  The median age was 48.3 years. For every 100 females, there were 96.4 males.  For every 100 females age 18 and over, there were 95.6 males.

The homeowner vacancy rate was 1.9%; the rental vacancy rate was 7.2%.  1,072 people (84.5% of the population) lived in owner-occupied housing units and 188 people (14.8%) lived in rental housing units.

2000
As of the 2000 United States Census of 2000, there were 1,247 people, 436 households, and 367 families residing in the CDP. The racial makeup of the CDP was 93.10% White, 0.56% African American, 1.12% Native American, 1.52% Asian, 0.88% from other races, and 2.81% from two or more races. Hispanic or Latino of any race were 2.57% of the population.

There were 436 households, out of which 37.6% had children under the age of 18 living with them, 74.5% were married couples living together, 7.8% had a female householder with no husband present, and 15.6% were non-families. 13.3% of all households were made up of individuals, and 5.3% had someone living alone who was 65 years of age or older.  The average household size was 2.85 and the average family size was 3.12.

In the CDP, the population was spread out, with 27.7% under the age of 18, 6.7% from 18 to 24, 22.7% from 25 to 44, 28.7% from 45 to 64, and 14.2% who were 65 years of age or older.  The median age was 41 years. For every 100 females, there were 95.8 males.  For every 100 females age 18 and over, there were 94.8 males.

The median income for a household in the CDP was $51,471, and the median income for a family was $60,385. Males had a median income of $47,232 versus $33,125 for females. The per capita income for the CDP was $23,419.  About 5.4% of families and 5.5% of the population were below the poverty line, including 14.1% of those under age 18 and none of those age 65 or over.

Politics

Notable people
Merle Haggard, country musician, lived in Palo Cedro for decades until his death on his 79th birthday (April 6, 2016).

Education
Elementary Schools
North Cow Creek School
Junction Elementary School
Chrysalis Charter School
Redding Christian School

Middle Schools
Junction Intermediate School
Saint Francis Middle School
Chrysalis Charter School
North Cow Creek School
Redding Christian School

High Schools
Foothill High School has an  API score of 817, making it one of the best public schools in northern California.
Bishop Quinn High School
Redding Christian School

Image gallery

References

Notes

Sources

Books and Journals

Internet

External links
Palo Cedro Community Park Project
Palo Cedro Chamber of Commerce
Foothill High School
Junction Elementary School District

Census-designated places in Shasta County, California
Census-designated places in California